Reuben Webster Millsaps (May 30, 1833 - June 28, 1916) was an American businessman, financier and philanthropist.

Early years
Reuben Webster Millsaps was born on May 30, 1833 in Pleasant Valley, Copiah County, Mississippi. He was of English, Scots-Irish, and Welsh descent. His family were farmers. He had eight siblings including William Green Millsaps.

He attended Indiana Asbury College, now known as DePauw University, and Harvard University Law School, where he earned a law degree.

Civil War
He fought in the American Civil War as a soldier in the Confederate States Army and was wounded twice during the war. He attained the military rank of Major.

Postbellum career
After returning from the war he pursued a successful career in business and finance. He was President of Capital State Bank in Jackson, Mississippi.

Philanthropy
In 1890, Millsaps donated US$550,000, which was matched by contributions from Mississippi's Methodist community, for the creation of "a Christian college within the borders of our state". The college is now known as Millsaps College and is located in Jackson, Mississippi. He devoted the rest of his life to the building and running of the college.

Death

He died at his home in Jackson on June 28, 1916, at the age of 83. He was buried on the campus of Millsaps College in Jackson.

References

External links
Millsaps College

1833 births
1916 deaths
People from Copiah County, Mississippi
Businesspeople from Jackson, Mississippi
American bankers
American educational theorists
DePauw University alumni
Harvard Law School alumni
Millsaps College
Philanthropists from Mississippi
Lawyers from Jackson, Mississippi
Confederate States Army officers
19th-century American businesspeople
19th-century American lawyers
19th-century American philanthropists